Lewellyn may refer to:

 Lewellyn Park, a public park in Troutdale, Oregon, United States
 Lewellyn Christensen (1909–1984), American ballet dancer, choreographer and director

See also
 Llewellin
 Llywelyn